The 1990 Michigan gubernatorial election was held on November 6, 1990, to elect the Governor and Lieutenant Governor of the state of Michigan. John Engler, a member of the Republican Party and State Senate majority leader, was elected over Democratic Party nominee, incumbent governor James Blanchard, who was seeking his third term.

In what turned out to be one of the closest elections in recent Michigan history, Engler defeated Blanchard by 17,000 votes and a 0.7% margin. Engler's victory was considered a major upset and became infamous among pollsters. The final Detroit News poll showed Engler trailing by 14 points, and the final Detroit Free Press poll showed Engler behind by 4 points. A retrospective of the polling suggests the News poll may have had questions that favored Blanchard and too heavily incorporated the opinions of registered voters rather than likely voters, and thus failed to correctly gauge turnout. 

The voter turnout was 38.6%. This was the last time until 2022, that the state elected a governor of the same party as the sitting president.

Republican Primary
State Senate Majority Leader John Engler faced nominal opposition in the primary, easily defeating retired General Motors engineer and perennial political candidate John Lauve. Engler then chose state Sen. Connie Binsfeld as his running mate.

Democratic Primary
James Blanchard, a two-term incumbent, won the Democratic primary unopposed. He created controversy in the summer 1990 with speculation that he might drop Lt. Gov. Martha Griffiths from the Democratic ticket. There was speculation that Blanchard was positioning to appoint himself to replace Sen. Donald W. Riegle Jr. should Riegle have to resign due to his involvement in the Keating Five scandal and being under investigation by the Senate Ethics Committee and wanted a younger running mate to take over as governor. After weeks of speculation, Griffiths, 78, offered to remove herself from the ticket and not formally seek the Democratic nomination for lieutenant governor at the Michigan Democratic Convention. Olivia Maynard, who was the Director of the Michigan Office of Services to the Aging, was ultimately chosen as Blanchard's running mate. Ultimately, Riegle survived the scandal but the scandal along with the unpopularity of President Bill Clinton, led to Riegle announcing that he would not seek re-election and he left the Senate at the end of his term on January 3, 1995.

Results

References

Governor
1990
Michigan